= Ignu =

Poem written by Allen Ginsberg

Ignu is a poem written by Allen Ginsberg in 1958.

It describes a specific type of person, called an Ignu, who, among other numerous attributes, "lives only once and eternally and knows it," and "sleeps in everybody's bed." Ginsberg mentions many of his friends in the poem as examples of Ignus, including William S. Burroughs
